Dorrance Earnest Funk (born February 3, 1941), known professionally as Dory Funk Jr., is an American retired professional wrestler and wrestling trainer. The son of Dory Funk (Dorrance Wilhelm Funk) and brother of Terry Funk, he was the promoter of the Amarillo, Texas-based Western States Sports promotion.

Funk held the NWA Worlds Heavyweight Championship once. He is the second-longest reigning NWA World Heavyweight Champion of all time after Lou Thesz. He held the WWC Universal Heavyweight Championship once and the CWA World Heavyweight Championship once. He is a 2009 WWE Hall of Fame inductee. 

Funk works for All Japan Pro Wrestling as the Pacific Wrestling Federation (PWF) chairman and runs the Funking Conservatory, a professional wrestling school. Overall in major professional wrestling promotions, he is a one-time world champion consisting of the NWA Worlds Heavyweight Championship, which is widely recognized as a counterpart to the WWE Championship.

Professional wrestling career

Training 

With a background in amateur wrestling and football, Funk's career in professional wrestling began in 1963 just after a college football career with West Texas State University (now West Texas A&M University), culminating in a 15 to 14 victory over Ohio University in the Sun Bowl in El Paso, Texas. Funk's first match was a victory over Don Fargo in Amarillo, Texas. West Texas State University All American Jerry Logan was in Funk's corner and Fargo's brother, Jim, was in his corner. Funk was supported by the whole West Texas State University football team and the Tascosa High School amateur wrestling team. He was doing his student teaching as coach of the Tascosa High wrestling team under coach James Kyle.

National Wrestling Alliance (1963–1987) 

Funk started in his father's Amarillo, Texas-based Western States Sports promotion and fought Harley Race, Iron Mike DiBiase and Wild Bull Curry. He demonstrated a rugged hard-hitting style that gained attention. He would eventually move on to Florida, Missouri and Japan where his skills improved as he used uppercut forearm smashes, a variety of suplexes and leglocks. Funk won the NWA World Heavyweight Championship from Gene Kiniski on February 11, 1969  in Tampa, Florida with a spinning toe hold and remained NWA World Champion for the next four and a half years, which is the second-longest uninterrupted reign of any NWA World Champion (Lou Thesz held the NWA world title from November 27, 1949, to March 15, 1956).

Dory and Terry are the only brothers in history to each hold the title. Funk finally lost the NWA World Championship on May 24, 1973, after a hurried recovery from a pickup truck accident on his father's Flying Mare Ranch in West Texas. Dory was forced into the ring in Kansas City, losing the belt to Harley Race. He performed regularly throughout the NWA, particularly in the Mid-Atlantic and Ontario as a heel, Georgia, Florida and Central States regions, through the 1970s and early 1980s. In Toronto he fought Ric Flair for the NWA championship on October 17, 1982. Flair retained the title. In 1987 he feuded with Mike Rotunda in Florida. Rotunda defeated Funk for the vacant Florida Heavyweight title on June 7. Later on a lot of the matches ended in draws.

All Japan Pro Wrestling (1973–1987) 
In 1973, Funk made his debut for All Japan Pro Wrestling which had just started the year before. Eventually he became a veteran of the company. He feuded with Giant Baba, The Destroyer, Jumbo Tsuruta, Abdullah The Butcher, The Sheik, Genichiro Tenryu, and Harley Race. Terry Funk and he worked frequently as a tag team in a series of matches against Abdullah the Butcher and The Sheik; and Giant Baba and Jumbo Tsuruta. Funk won many World's Strongest Tag Determination League awards with both Terry and Baba. Together Terry and he won the World's Strongest Tag Determination League tournaments in 1977, 1979, and 1982.

On December 11, 1980, the Funks won Match of the Year Award from Tokyo Sports in their match against Giant Baba and Jumbo Tsuruta. His biggest achievement in All Japan was winning the NWA International Heavyweight Championship three times. He won a tournament for the vacant heavyweight title defeating Terry on April 30, 1981. He dropped the title to Butch Reed that June. Later he defeated Reed in August. On October 9 he dropped the title to Bruiser Brody in Tokyo. He regained the title form Brody on November 1. Eventually he lost the title to Brody on April 21, 1982, in Osaka. Later in his tenure he feuded with Brody, Stan Hansen and Tiger Jeet Singh. The Funks feuded with Riki Choshu and Yoshiaki Yatsu; and the Youngbloods.

World Wrestling Federation (1986) 

In 1986, Dory (renamed "Hoss") made his WWF debut in a team alongside his brother Terry. The brothers performed at WrestleMania 2 defeating the Junkyard Dog and Tito Santana. Terry left the WWF shortly after WrestleMania, but Dory remained, mostly tagging with storyline brother Jimmy Jack Funk, who in truth had no relation to the Funk family. They were managed by Jimmy Hart. He would feud with Junkyard Dog. They feuded with The British Bulldogs. Funk wrestled his last WWF match to Pedro Morales at the Sam Muchunik Memorial Tournament on August 29.

World Wrestling Council and various promotions (1987–1989) 
On September 20, 1987, he and Terry teamed up and lost to The Road Warriors by disqualification at World Wrestling Council 14th Anversario in Bayamón, Puerto Rico. On February 27, 1988, Funk participated in World Wrestling Council's La Copa Gillette tournament beating Bruiser Brody in the first round but later that day he lost to Carlos Colon in the quarter finals. On April 11, 1988, he lost to Jerry Lawler by count out at Continental Wrestling Association in Memphis, Tennessee. He reunited with Terry at World Wrestling Alliance defeating Doug Somers and Gary Young on February 2, 1989, in Kansas City, Kansas.

Return to All Japan Pro Wrestling (1990–1996) 
In October 1990 both Terry and Dory returned to All Japan. They wrestled in tag team matches until Terry left the promotion in April 1991 and went back to North America. Dory found a new partner, Al Perez and they won World's Strongest Tag Determination League Teamwork Award later that year. They lost to Andre the Giant and Giant Baba on November 30, 1991, in Obihiro. At the end of the year Perez left Japan and returned to the United States. In 1992 he once again teamed up with Baba. Later on he teamed with numerous partners. From 1990 to 1996 he feuded with Abdullah the Butcher and Giant Kimala. He left Japan at the end of 1996.

Extreme Championship Wrestling (1994, 1997) 
In 1994 Funk made his debut for Extreme Championship Wrestling. He reunited with Terry for the first time in three years. Terry was a main star for the company. They feuded with The Public Enemy during Dory's stay in ECW. On June 26 they teamed up with Tommy Dreamer to defeat Hack Meyers and Public Enemy on ECW Hardcore TV. They lost to Public Enemy at ECW Heat Wave 1994 in a No Rope Barbed Wire match. Dory returned to ECW on September 27, 1997, losing to ECW Champion Shane Douglas.

Later years (1993–2020) 
He made an appearance for World Championship Wrestling at the Slamboree 1993: A Legends Reunion Pay-Per-View, wrestling Nick Bockwinkel to a time limit draw in 15 minutes. Funk had Gene Kiniski in his corner and Bockwinkel had Verne Gagne in his corner. He teamed up with Dick Murdoch defeating The Heavenly Bodies at tribute show to Dory called Funk Free For All in Amarillo, Texas October 28, 1993. The Funks wrestled Bruce Hart and Brian Pillman at the Stu Hart 50th Anniversary Show on December 15, 1995, in Calgary, Canada. He made a return appearance with the WWF as a participant in the 1996 Royal Rumble being eliminated by Savio Vega. On June 6, 1997, he made another appearance in WCW at Ilio DiPaolo Memorial Show teaming with Greg Valentine as they lost to Tony Parsi and Gino Brito by disqualification in Buffalo, New York. On September 11, 1997, Dory took part in Terry Funk Presents Wrestle Fest: 50 Years of Funk event. Terry was planning to retire from wrestling for the first time. That night, Dory defeated Rob Van Dam. He won the NWA Florida Heavyweight Championship for the fourth time since 1981 defeating Steve Keirn on November 7, 1997. Then he would hold the title until August 15, 2000, when the title was vacated. In 2001 he wrestled for New Japan Pro-Wrestling teaming with Terry. He feuded with Tatsumi Fujinami and Bob Backlund. Funk and student, Adam Windsor wrestled in a dark match for NWA Total Non-stop Action defeating Homicide and Kory Chavis on November 27, 2002. On January 25, 2005, he teamed with Terry at WrestleReunion where they lost to NWA World Tag Team champions America's Most Wanted.

Funk returned to Puerto Rico for WWC Friday Madness where he defeated Carlos Colon on May 20, 2005. At WrestleReunion 2 Dory, Terry and Mick Foley lost to The Midnight Express in a six-man tag team match on August 27, 2005. On March 5, 2006, he teamed with Mike Graham to defeat David Flair and Tully Blanchard at World Wrestling Legends. On the February 16, 2009 episode of Raw, it was announced that Dory along with his brother Terry would be inducted into the WWE Hall of Fame Class of 2009 by Dusty Rhodes. On the April 1, 2010 edition of TNA Today, Funk appeared on the show to have an interview with Jeremy Borash. Since 2002 Dory been wrestling for his own promotion Funking Conservatory known as "BangTV!" in Ocala, Florida. On September 3, 2006, he lost to Samoa Joe in a Lumberjack match. From 2015 to 2018 Funk has wrestled for Tokyo Gurentai. His last match was against another student of his Osamu Nishimura which ended in a  10-minute draw on November 28, 2018. With the finals seconds left in the match, Funk pinned Nishimura which ended at the count of 2 when the bell rang as time was up. Funk wrestled multiple times during 2019 on the independent circuit.  

On Leap year 2020 Funk teamed with The Steiner Brothers (Rick and Scott) to defeat the team of Blain Rage, Jake Logan, and Shane Chung at Funking Conservatory in Ocala, Florida.

Second return to All Japan (2008) 
On March 1, 2008, Funk and Osamu Nishimura defeated Genichiro Tenryu and Masanobu Fuchi in Funk's retirement match via spinning toe hold.

Third return to All Japan (2013–2017) 
On October 27, 2013, Funk returned to All Japan Pro Wrestling, teaming with Terry in a tag team match, where they wrestled Masanobu Fuchi and Osamu Nishimura to a twenty-minute time limit draw. Funk was then announced as the new Pacific Wrestling Federation (PWF) chairman. Funk returned to All Japan on July 27, 2014, teaming with Osamu Nishimura and Yutaka Yoshie in a six-man tag team match, where they defeated Masanobu Fuchi, Takao Omori and Último Dragón, with Funk submitting Fuchi for the win. On May 30, 2015, he teamed with old student Genichiro Tenryu and Nosawa Rongai for Tenryu Project to beat Kohei Suwama, Hikaru Sato and Atsushi Aoki. Funk's next match with All Japan took place on May 31, 2015, when he and Nishimura wrestled Fuchi and Yoshiaki Fujiwara to a twenty-minute time limit draw. He returned to All Japan the next month to team with Fuchi and Ultimo Dragon to beat his student Nishimura, Masao Inoue and Soma Takao. His last match for All Japan was on November 28, 2017, teaming with Nishimura, The Great Kabuki and his student Dalton Drellich as they defeated Fuchi, Great Kojika, Atsushi Maruyama and Daisuke Sekimoto in Yokohama.

Retirement (2017–present) 

On December 31, 2017, Funk announced his retirement from wrestling.

Funking Conservatory (1991–present) 
Funk is currently the coach of the Funking Conservatory Professional Wrestling School in Ocala, Florida and teaches the Dory Funk Method of Professional Wrestling. It had a branch affiliated with the World Wrestling Federation called the "Funkin' Dojo. Dory's students included Jeff Hardy, Matt Hardy, Christian Cage, Lita, Kurt Angle, Mansoor, Mickie James, Edge, Ted DiBiase, and Test. His wife Marti runs BANG TV in which Dory's matches are featured.

Personal life 
Dory married his first wife, Jimmie, on June 8, 1960. Together, they have three children: Dory III, Adam Dirk, and Penny. They also have five grandchildren. They later separated and were officially divorced on July 6, 1983. Dory III went into medicine and now practices out of Colorado. Dory IV is now training to be a wrestler under Dory Jr. In 1980, Dory met his second and current wife, Marti; the couple married in 1989. They have two children.

Championships and accomplishments 

 All Japan Pro Wrestling
NWA International Heavyweight Championship (2 times)
World's Strongest Tag Determination League (1977, 1979, 1982) – with Terry Funk
NWA International Heavyweight Championship Tournament (1981)
World's Strongest Tag Determination League Technical Award (1977) – with Terry Funk
World's Strongest Tag Determination League Teamplay Award (1980) – with Terry Funk
World's Strongest Tag Determination League Distinguished Service Medal Award (1984) – with Terry Funk
World's Strongest Tag Determination League Skill Award (1985) – with Giant Baba
World's Strongest Tag Determination League Technique Award (1986) – with Terry Funk
World's Strongest Tag Determination League Technique Award (1987) – with Terry Funk
World's Strongest Tag Determination League Excellent Team Award (1990) – with Terry Funk
World's Strongest Tag Determination League Teamwork Award (1991) – with Al Perez
 Cauliflower Alley Club
Lou Thesz Award (2019)
Other honoree (1998)
 Championship Wrestling from Florida
NWA Florida Heavyweight Championship (4 times)
NWA Florida Tag Team Championship (1 time) – with Terry Funk
NWA Florida Television Championship (2 times)
NWA International Heavyweight Championship (1 time)
NWA North American Tag Team Championship (Florida version) (2 times) – with Terry Funk (1) and David Von Erich (1)
 Continental Wrestling Association
CWA World Heavyweight Championship (1 time)
 George Tragos/Lou Thesz Professional Wrestling Hall of Fame
Class of 2011
 Georgia Championship Wrestling
NWA Georgia Tag Team Championship (1 time) – with Terry Funk
NWA Georgia Tag Team Championship Tournament (1978) – with Terry Funk
 International Championship Wrestling
ICW Heavyweight Championship (1 time)
 International Professional Wrestling Hall of Fame
Class of 2022
 Mid-Atlantic Championship Wrestling
NWA Mid-Atlantic Heavyweight Championship (2 times)
 National Wrestling Alliance
NWA Hall of Fame (Class of 2006)
NWA World Heavyweight Championship (1 time)
 NWA Hollywood Wrestling
NWA Americas Heavyweight Championship (1 time)
NWA International Tag Team Championship (3 times) – with Terry Funk
NWA World Tag Team Championship (Los Angeles Version) (1 time) – with Terry Funk
 New England Wrestling Alliance
NEWA North American Heavyweight Championship (1 time)
 Pro Wrestling Illustrated
PWI Match of the Year (1973) vs. Harley Race on May 24
PWI Match of the Year (1974) vs. Jack Brisco on January 27
Stanley Weston Award (2014)
PWI ranked him #147 of the top 500 singles wrestlers in the PWI 500 in 1994
PWI ranked him #149 of the top 500 singles wrestlers of the "PWI Years" in 2003
PWI ranked him #9 of the top 100 tag teams of the "PWI Years" with Terry Funk in 2003
 Professional Wrestling Hall of Fame and Museum
Class of 2005
 Pro Wrestling Illustrated
Stanley Weston Achievement Award
 Southwest Championship Wrestling
SCW Southwest Heavyweight Championship (1 time)
SCW World Tag Team Championship (1 time) – with Terry Funk
 St. Louis Wrestling Hall of Fame
Class of 2008
 St. Louis Wrestling Club
NWA Missouri Heavyweight Championship (1 time)
 Stampede Wrestling
NWA International Tag Team Championship (Calgary version) (1 time) – with Larry Lane
Stampede Wrestling Hall of Fame (Class of 1995)
 Tokyo Sports
Match of the Year Award (1980) with Terry Funk vs. Giant Baba and Jumbo Tsuruta on December 11
 Western States Sports
NWA Brass Knuckles Championship (Amarillo version) (2 times)
NWA International Tag Team Championship (2 times) – with Terry Funk
NWA North American Heavyweight Championship (Amarillo version) (1 time)
NWA Western States Tag Team Championship (6 times) – with Ricky Romero (2), The Super Destroyer (2), Ray Candy (1),  and Larry Lane (1)
NWA World Tag Team Championship (2 times) – with Terry Funk
NWA World Tag Team Championship (Amarillo version) (3 times) – with Terry Funk
 World Wrestling Council
WWC Puerto Rico Heavyweight Championship (1 time)
WWC Universal Heavyweight Championship (1 time)
WWC World Tag Team Championship (1 time) – with Terry Funk
 World Wrestling Entertainment
WWE Hall of Fame (Class of 2009)
 Wrestling Observer Newsletter
Wrestling Observer Newsletter Hall of Fame (Class of 1996)
 Other titles
New York Heavyweight Championship (1 time)

References

External links 

 
 The Funks at WWE.com
 

1941 births
American male professional wrestlers
ICW/IWCCW Heavyweight Champions
Living people
NWA World Heavyweight Champions
Professional wrestlers from Florida
Professional wrestlers from Indiana
Professional wrestlers from Texas
Professional Wrestling Hall of Fame and Museum
Professional wrestling promoters
Professional wrestling trainers
Sportspeople from Amarillo, Texas
Sportspeople from Hammond, Indiana
Sportspeople from Ocala, Florida
Sportspeople from the Chicago metropolitan area
Stampede Wrestling alumni
Western States Sports
West Texas A&M Buffaloes football players
WWE Hall of Fame inductees
20th-century professional wrestlers
21st-century professional wrestlers
WWC Universal Heavyweight Champions
WWC Puerto Rico Champions
NWA Florida Heavyweight Champions
NWA Florida Tag Team Champions
NWA Florida Television Champions
NWA North American Tag Team Champions (Florida version)
Stampede Wrestling International Tag Team Champions
NWA Americas Heavyweight Champions
NWA International Heavyweight Champions
NWA International Tag Team Champions
NWA Georgia Tag Team Champions